William Julius Bowers (February 27, 1926 –  February 28, 1977) was an American baseball catcher in the Negro leagues and Minor League Baseball. He played with the New York Black Yankees from 1946 to 1950 as a reserve catcher. He then played for several clubs in the Eastern League, Northern League, Big State League and Evangeline League from 1951 to 1955.

Bowers has been inducted into the Staten Island Sports Hall of Fame.

References

External links
 and Seamheads

New York Black Yankees players
Hartford Chiefs players
Eau Claire Bears players
Corpus Christi Clippers players
Lake Charles Lakers players
1926 births
1977 deaths
20th-century African-American sportspeople
Baseball catchers